Zhiyuan Temple is a Buddhist temple located in Shaling Town of Panshan County, Liaoning, China.

History
Zhiyuan Temple was originally built in the 19th century, during the Guangxu period (1871–1908) of the Qing dynasty (1644–1911), but because of war and natural disasters has been rebuilt numerous times since then. The present version was completed in August 1998.

Architecture
The existing main buildings include the Shanmen, Four Heavenly Kings Hall, Drum Tower, Bell Tower, Mahavira Hall, Guru Hall, and Buddhist Texts Library.

Mahavira Hall
At the back of Sakyamuni's statue is the statue of Guanyin. The statues of Eighteen Arhats stand on both sides of the hall.

References

Buddhist temples in Liaoning
Buildings and structures in Panjin
Tourist attractions in Panjin
19th-century establishments in China
19th-century Buddhist temples
Religious buildings and structures completed in 1998